The Thomasville Depot in Thomasville, Georgia was built in 1914.  It was listed on the National Register of Historic Places in 1988.

The station served the Atlantic Coast Line Railroad. In later years it served the ACL's successor, the Seaboard Coast Line, and also Amtrak. Trains included the South Wind (Illinois Central Chicago–Miami train, running over ACL, later, SCL lines) and Amtrak's Floridian (also Chicago–Miami). The station also served a side branch of the ACL's (later, SCL) Champion originating in Montgomery, Alabama and heading northeast to New York City. Passenger service ended with the demise of the Floridian in 1979.

The depot building has two stories and some Mission/Spanish Revival styling.  The listing included the depot building, a train platform shed, and a Railway Express Agency (REA) building.

The three buildings are also contributing buildings in the Thomasville Commercial Historic District.

References

Railway stations on the National Register of Historic Places in Georgia (U.S. state)
Mission Revival architecture in Georgia (U.S. state)
Railway stations in the United States opened in 1914
National Register of Historic Places in Thomas County, Georgia
Atlantic Coast Line Railroad stations
Former Atlantic Coast Line Railroad stations
Former railway stations in Georgia (U.S. state)
Former Amtrak stations in the United States